State Route 718 is a  state highway in Churchill County, Nevada. It runs west from US 95 south of Fallon.

Major intersections

References

718
Transportation in Churchill County, Nevada